Verse may refer to:

Poetry 
 Verse, an occasional synonym for poetry
 Verse, a metrical structure, a stanza
 Blank verse, a type of poetry having regular meter but no rhyme
 Free verse, a type of poetry written without the use of strict meter or rhyme, but still recognized as poetry
 Versed, 2009 collection of poetry by Rae Armantrout
 Verse, an international poetry journal with Henry Hart (author) as founding editor

Religion 
 Chapters and verses of the Bible
 Ayah, one of the 6,236 verses found in the Qur'an

Music 
 Verse (band), a hardcore punk band
 Verse (rapper) (b. 1986),  British hip hop artist
 Verse (popular music), roughly corresponds to a poetic stanza
 Verse-chorus form, a musical form common in popular music where the chorus is highlighted
 Verses (album), a 1987 album by jazz trumpeter Wallace Roney
 Verses (Apallut), a 2001 album by the Alaskan group Pamyua
 Verse, a 2002 album by Patricia Barber
 Ben Mount (born 1977), also known as The Verse or MC Verse, British rapper, producer and record label owner
 "Verses", a commonly used unofficial title for a studio outtake by Cardiacs included on Toy World

Other uses 
 Jared Verse, American football player
 Verse (film), a 2009 Bolivian film
 Verse protocol, a networking protocol allowing real-time communication between computer graphics software
 Verse (river), a river of North Rhine-Westphalia, Germany
 Verse (programming language), a functional logic programming language developed by Epic Games

See also 
 Versus (disambiguation)